The year 1818 in archaeology involved some significant events.

Events 
 June 13 - Caspar Reuvens is appointed as the world's first professor of archaeology, at Leiden University in the Kingdom of the Netherlands.

Explorations 
 Giovanni Battista Belzoni explores the interior of the Great Pyramid of Giza.

Finds 
 Ancient temple at Sanchi.
 1818 or 1819 - Prajnaparamita of Java.

Publications 
 Juan Ramis publishes Antigüedades célticas de la isla de Menorca ("Celtic Antiquities of the Island of Menorca") in Mahón, the first book in the Spanish language entirely devoted to prehistory.

Births

Deaths

See also 
 Ancient Egypt / Egyptology

References

Archaeology
Archaeology by year
Archaeology
Archaeology